Lucius Baston is an American actor from Queens, New York. He is known for best known for his roles in Atlanta, Lovecraft Country and The Underground Railroad.

Early life
The younger of two boys, Baston started entertaining at the age of 11 years old as a disc jockey (DJ) for community and school events. Later on through multiple changes in profession, Baston sparked a new interest in an acting career by gazing upon head-shots from a fellow friend. Since 2005, he started the progression of his roles on screen.

Career
After working as a DJ in his youth, Baston joined the United States Air Force for eleven years. He later proceeded to pursue a career in electronics, and then on the air as a radio broadcaster. After these endeavors, Baston went on to making a career in the acting industry. He started by going to the Performers Studio Workshop where he honed in on his skills.

Filmography

Film

Television

References

People from Queens, New York
Living people
American male actors
African-American male actors
African-American people
Year of birth missing (living people)